Gosseldange is a small town in the commune of Lintgen, in central Luxembourg.  , the town has a population of 442.

Near to the town of Gosseldange is the Gousselerbierg, under which passes the Gousselerbierg Tunnel, the second-longest tunnel in Luxembourg.

Lintgen
Towns in Luxembourg